The Inter/National Coalition for Electronic Portfolio Research (INCEPR) is a non-profit organization, based in the United States but with international partners and operations, dedicated to conducting research on the impact of eportfolios on student learning and educational outcomes.

Shape of the coalition

Overview
The INCEPR conducts eportfolio research through a series of staggered and overlapping cohorts serving three-year terms. Each cohort is formed, through an application process, by select faculty, staff, and administrators from approximately ten colleges or universities either in the US or abroad. Each cohort has its own research agenda, and each member institution proposes an appropriate study, provides updates on their progress, and reports findings to the other members of the cohort throughout the term. There have been six Cohorts thus far.

Focused agendas
Four of the six INCEPR cohorts have had research agendas that were focused in a particular area. Cohort I and Cohort II focused on reflection in eportfolios, Cohort III focused on integrative learning and student/academic affairs, Cohort IV focused on the relationship between personal development plans and eportfolios, and Cohort VI focused on assessment.

Steven J. Corbett, a member of Cohort I with the University of Washington, reported on his team's findings for Inside Higher Ed:

In short, our findings suggest: most students take to writing with technology quite well, and those who do not usually benefit from the practice and explicit instruction; instructors and administrators sometimes need just as much help learning about technological choices and options (let alone teaching them) as students; and online writing environments do not magically produce better student writing — or better teaching practices — but can allow for practice with different composing and teaching skills, which can lead to better writing, teaching, and administering depending on the form (for example awareness of audio, visual, and design considerations).

Partners
The coalition works with partner organizations, including the Center for Recording Achievement and the Higher Education Academy in the UK. The third cohort was sponsored by NASPA: Student Affairs Administrators in Higher Education.

The coalition is listed among the "Relevant Organizations" to electronic portfolio research by the National Council of Teachers of English.

History
The INCEPR was founded in 2003 by Barbara Cambridge and Kathleen Blake Yancey. Since 2009 Barbara Cambridge, Darren Cambridge, and Kathi Yancey have been co-directors of the coalition.

Cohorts
The following is a list of cohorts, their years of operation, and their member institutions.

Cohort I (2003-2006)
Alverno College
Bowling Green State University
Indiana University-Purdue University Indianapolis (IUPUI)
LaGuardia Community College
Northern Illinois University
Portland State University
Stanford University
University of Washington
Virginia Tech

Cohort II (2004-2009)
Clemson University
Kapi'olani Community College
George Mason University
Thomas College
Ohio State University
University of Georgia
University of Illinois
University of Nebraska Omaha
Washington State University

Cohort III (2006-2009)
Arizona State University Polytechnic
California State University System
Florida State University
Framingham State University
George Mason University
Minnesota State Colleges and Universities
Penn State University
Seton Hall University
Sheffield Hallam University
University of San Diego
University of Waterloo
University of Wolverhampton

Cohort IV (2007-2010)
University of Bradford
University of Cumbria
University of Groningen
London Metropolitan University
University of Manchester Medical School
University of Michigan
University of Northumbria
University of Nottingham
Queen Margaret University College
University of Wolverhampton

Cohort V (2008-2011)
Kapi'olani Community College
University of Akron
University of Cincinnati
University of Denver
University of Oregon
Virginia State University
Virginia Tech

Cohort VI (2010-2013)
Bowling Green State University
Curtin University of Technology (Australia)
Goshen College
Indiana University Purdue University Indianapolis
Lamar University
Northeastern University
Portland State University
University of Georgia
University of Michigan
University of Mississippi
Virginia Military Institute
Westminster College

References 

E-learning
Educational organizations based in the United States